Oskar Ekberg (born 19 February 1977, in Södertälje) is a Swedish pianist basically active as a performer at the Swedish concert scene. He has shown particular interest in Olivier Messiaen's and Johan Helmich Roman's music, the latter recorded on Daphne Records. He has also recently recorded the complete piano music of Elfrida Andrée. Oskar Ekberg is also working as an orchestra pianist in the major orchestras of Sweden. Ekberg teaches at Ersta Sköndal University College.

References

External links
 
 Daphne Records
 Academus AB
 2007 Grieg Festival in Stockholm
 2008 Olivier Messiaen Festival in Stockholm

1977 births
Living people
Swedish classical pianists
Male classical pianists
21st-century classical pianists
21st-century Swedish male musicians